Carlton Lloyd Palmer (born 5 December 1965) is an English football manager, former footballer and football television pundit whose last management role was as manager of Grantham Town.

As a player, he was a midfielder from 1984 to 2005, playing in the Premier League for Sheffield Wednesday, Leeds United, Southampton, Nottingham Forest and Coventry City. He also played for West Bromwich Albion, Watford and Dublin City. He was capped 18 times by England and was part of the squad at UEFA Euro 1992.

He went into management in 2001 when he was appointed player-manager of Stockport County, later holding the same position at Mansfield Town from 2004 to 2005. In 2021 he had a brief return to management with a spell at non-league Grantham Town.

Club career
Palmer started his career at West Bromwich Albion, joining as an apprentice in July 1983 before turning professional in December 1984. He made his league debut in September 1985, as a substitute against Newcastle United. He earned a move to Sheffield Wednesday in February 1989 for £750,000, where he made his name in the old First Division. He missed Wednesday's victory in the 1991 Football League Cup Final due to suspension.

He was bought by Leeds United under manager Howard Wilkinson for £2.6 million in June 1994.

In September 1997 he was signed by Southampton manager Dave Jones for a fee of £1.0 million. In the dressing room he was "abrasive, awkward and argumentative" but on the pitch he was "determined, hard-working and persistent" and his long legs made him "a most difficult player to compete against". Jones said of Palmer "He covers every blade of grass out there, but that's only because his first touch is so crap". In January 1999 he was transferred to Nottingham Forest for a fee of £1.1 million and was replaced in Southampton's midfield by Chris Marsden.

He scored once for Nottingham Forest, his strike coming in a 2–1 win over Grimsby Town. He later played for Coventry City, scoring his first and what turned out to be only goal for the club in a 4–1 win over Newcastle United. Coventry loaned him out to Watford for three months in 2000–01. He also had a loan spell at Sheffield Wednesday, before joining Stockport County in November 2001 as player-manager. Palmer also briefly played for Dublin City in Ireland, whom he joined in August 2004 and played three games before leaving the club.

International career
Graham Taylor gave Palmer all of his 18 caps for the England national team. Palmer scored his first and only goal for England against San Marino. He was a member of the England squad that went to the 1992 European Championships in Sweden. He was also capped 5 times for the England B team.

Managerial career
Palmer's management career began when he was appointed player-manager of Stockport County in November 2001. He was sacked by the club in September 2003, following a poor start to the season.

In November 2004, events involving Mansfield Town manager Keith Curle resulted in Curle being suspended. With no manager, the Mansfield chairman rang up Carlton and asked him if he would join The Stags temporarily as manager of the club, which Carlton accepted, without being paid. Curle was later dismissed and Carlton Palmer signed a contract until 2006 as manager of Mansfield Town. In September 2005, after Mansfield Town were beaten 2–0 by Rochdale and close to the League Two relegation zone, Palmer resigned as manager saying "I have had a good career and I don't need to take the abuse from the crowd. Keith Haslam, the Mansfield chairman, is a good mate of mine and I want to keep it that way so I will be stepping down as manager". In April 2021 he was appointed manager of Grantham Town.

On 14 September at the age of 55, Palmer named himself as a substitute in a game against Ashton United due to injuries.

On 9 November 2021, Palmer resigned as manager of Grantham Town. He had joined Grantham to work alongside chairman Darren Ashton, and left as Ashton had resigned from his role.

Personal life
In 1997, Palmer was found guilty of sexual assault after groping a teenage girl. He was fined £600. Palmer later appealed the conviction which was rejected.

Palmer owned an online estate agency in Sheffield called The Home Game which ceased trading in August 2008. In March 2009 he starred in a Paddy Power TV advert which involved him being in a bath with a football fan. In June 2010 Palmer appeared in a one-off football special of Come Dine with Me where he came in first place and won £1,000 for charity. After working in Dubai for Repton School, he set up his own Football Academy in 2012 teaching football and P.E. From August 2014, Carlton will be Director of Sport at Wellington College, Shanghai.

In December 2016, Palmer required a life-saving five-hour operation for a heart condition. He made a full recovery.

Honours
Sheffield Wednesday
 FA Cup runner-up: 1992–93
 Football League Cup: 1990–91; runner-up: 1992–93

Leeds United
 Football League Cup runner-up: 1995–96

Individual
PFA Team of the Year: 1990–91 Second Division

References

External links

1965 births
Living people
People from Rowley Regis
English footballers
English expatriate footballers
Association football midfielders
England international footballers
England B international footballers
England under-21 international footballers
West Bromwich Albion F.C. players
Sheffield Wednesday F.C. players
Leeds United F.C. players
Southampton F.C. players
Nottingham Forest F.C. players
Coventry City F.C. players
Watford F.C. players
Stockport County F.C. players
Dublin City F.C. players
Mansfield Town F.C. players
Staveley Miners Welfare F.C. players
Grantham Town F.C. players
English Football League players
Premier League players
English expatriate sportspeople in Ireland
Expatriate association footballers in the Republic of Ireland
League of Ireland players
UEFA Euro 1992 players
English football managers
Stockport County F.C. managers
Mansfield Town F.C. managers
English people of Guyanese descent
Grantham Town F.C. managers
FA Cup Final players